Woodrow Wilson High School (colloquially known as Long Beach Wilson) is an American public high school located in Long Beach, California. This two-block campus is located approximately 1.5 miles from the Pacific Ocean, across from the Recreation Park, and approximately 3 miles from Orange County.

History
Woodrow Wilson Classical High School was established in 1925 as the second school in the city, and ultimately opened for classes in 1926. The institution was named after Woodrow Wilson, who was an American politician and served as the 28th president of the United States. In 1926, a group of high school students chose the nickname Bruins as well as the colors Cardinal and Gold for Long Beach Wilson, due to close distance of two prestigious research universities, the University of California, Los Angeles and the University of Southern California, respectively.

Academics

The "Classical" Term
Woodrow Wilson Classical High School earned the distinction of being "classical" (hence the term being in the official school name) when they offered graduates a diploma with higher distinction than the regular diploma across the Long Beach Unified School District. Those who earned the "classical" diploma fulfilled one year of performing or visual arts and two years of foreign language in addition to the minimum requirements to graduate from a LBUSD high school. Wilson is the only school to offer such a high school diploma in the district.

Pathways
The institution offers five distinct pathways: Wilson Academic Vision of Excellence, School of the Arts, School of Leadership & Public Service, School of Medicine & Biotechnology, and School of Technology. The Distinguished Scholars program is offered to students who are in a school pathway and met academic requirements in middle school.

Wilson Academic Vision of Excellence

Referred to as WAVE, the Wilson Academic Vision of Excellence is the most rigorous pathway offered at the school. This liberal arts intensive program provides students the resources to earn acceptances at elite universities and colleges. In order to be qualified, students must earn at least a 3.60 GPA in middle school, be enrolled in Algebra I, receive at least an SBAC score of 2,500 in English, and indicate that the program is their first choice prior to applying. During the program, students must follow a road-map to graduation, which includes at least ten Advanced Placement courses.

Distinguished Scholars

The oldest program at Long Beach Wilson, Distinguished Scholars provides supplemental distinction for all students outside of those in the WAVE pathway. Although not a pathway itself, the program recognizes those who had a strong academic performance at the institution. Incoming students must receive acceptance by having at least a 3.3 GPA and be enrolled in Algebra I prior to applying. Those not meeting the prerequisites may achieve this award by obtaining at least a 3.3 GPA and receiving a C or higher in Algebra I in addition to the program requirements. The program requires students to have at least a 3.3 GPA, complete four Advanced Placement classes, and possess at least sixty hours of volunteering outside of the school community.

School of the Arts

The School of the Arts emphasizes the study of the arts through completion of courses studying several disciplines within the field, ranging from theatre to photography. Students must choose a primary and secondary discipline to study at Long Beach Wilson, while completing the requirements for graduation. Students primarily have opportunities related to the arts, such as completing a certification program at Long Beach City College in their discipline of choice. There are no additional prerequisites for this program prior to applying.

School of Leadership and Public Service

Designed for the future leaders of society, this program has students embark on experiences in a wide range of public service sectors. Students have the opportunity to take coursework that focuses on ways to benefit a sector, varying from forensic science to criminal law. In addition, students have several opportunities within the city, such as completing related certificate programs at Long Beach City College. There are no prerequisites for this program prior to applying.

School of Medicine and Biotechnology

Initiated by Project Lead the Way, students in the School of Medicine and Biotechnology gain experience in preparation for the field of medicine. Students are required to take a course sequence dedicated to the study of medicine. In addition, students apply the course sequence to internships throughout medical centers in Long Beach, and receive certificates in cardiopulmonary resuscitation and first aid. There are no prerequisites for this program prior to applying.

School of Technology

Started by Project Lead the Way, program participants complete coursework in computer science and related fields. Participants are required to complete a course sequence that will prepare them for the rise of technology in today's society. In addition, students will have the opportunity to actively seek and experience internships in the technology industry with their knowledge from the course sequence. There are no prerequisites for this pathway.

Advanced Placement

Woodrow Wilson Classical High school is a participating institution of the Advanced Placement program, which offers students the opportunity to gain college credit albeit two-year and four-year colleges having different policies for granting A.P. credit, if any. The program is maintained by College Board, an organization that administers the AP exams. Long Beach Wilson offers students the chance to participate in Advanced Placement for 27 different disciplines. Although there may be requirements to take an A.P. class, it is possible to challenge any A.P. exam (where the student takes the exam by being an autodidact for the discipline tested), regardless if Long Beach Wilson offers the course or not. As of the 2014-15 school year, Long Beach Wilson had 49% of the 12th grade student body tested at some time during high school where 71% of those passed at least one exam.

College admissions

The Class of 2021 spans throughout California within the California State University and University of California system, although alumni especially committed to universities in Southern California. The most popular destinations within both systems are Long Beach State (117 alumni), UCLA (13 alumni), Cal State Dominguez Hills (12 alumni), UC Santa Barbara (10 alumni), and UC Berkeley (9 alumni). Long Beach Wilson graduates are granted two years of free tuition at Long Beach City College, which has a dedicated Transfer Admission Guarantee resource center for transferring to the majority of UC and CSU Campuses. Admissions at private universities are sparse, but enrollments most recently occurred at Dartmouth, Pomona College, and Vassar College. Below are admissions tables derived from the University of California and California State University for the Class of 2021:

Rankings
 According to US News, Long Beach Wilson is No. 240 in the state and No. 1,301 in the nation for best overall high schools for the 2016-17 school year. Wilson also earned a silver medal, a distinction awarded for placing 501st to 2,673th best in the nation and had at least a 20.17 college readiness index. Wilson is the fifth best high school in the Long Beach Unified School District.
 According to The Washington Post, Woodrow Wilson Classical High School is No. 1,024 in the nation for "America's Most Challenging High Schools."
 According to Niche, Long Beach Wilson is No. 150 in the nation for "Standout Schools in America," which recognizes how much the school has positively impacted their community. Also, Wilson is No. 294 in the nation for "Most Diverse Public High Schools in America," which notes the diversity of a high school in terms of ethnicity.

Athletics
The Long Beach Wilson Bruins participate in the CIF Southern Section under the California Interscholastic Federation. The Bruins are primarily associated with the Moore League for conference play. The Bruins have a fierce rivalry with the Jackrabbits of Long Beach Poly across all sports, which originated from an American football match in 1932.

Varsity teams
The Bruins sponsor varsity teams in 12 boys', 12 girls', and three coed sports. All are CIF-sponsored sports unless indicated.

Boys
Baseball
Basketball
Cross country
Football
Golf
Lacrosse
Soccer
Swimming & diving
Tennis
Track and field
Volleyball
Water polo

Girls
Basketball
Cross country
Golf
Gymnastics
Lacrosse
Soccer
Softball
Swimming & diving
Tennis
Track and field
Volleyball
 Water polo

Coed
Badminton
Surfing
Wrestling

Championships
Long Beach Wilson has won 64 regional, 11 state, and 2 national championships since the institution fielded athletics in 1926.

Regional championships

Boys (51)
 Baseball (4): 1940, 1947, 1950, 2007
 Basketball (1): 1927
 Cross country (3): 1934, 1935, 1936
 Golf (20): 1928, 1930, 1932, 1933, 1935, 1939, 1940, 1943, 1944, 1945, 1946, 1948, 1949, 1950, 1951, 1952, 1953, 1965, 2016, 2017
 Gymnastics (2): 1970, 1977
 Soccer (1): 2003
 Swimming and diving (4): 1939, 1953, 1955, 1956
 Track and field (4): 1931, 1936, 1937, 1992
 Water polo (12): 1981, 1994, 1996, 1997, 1998, 1999, 2001, 2002, 2003, 2004, 2005, 2011
Girls (13)
 Basketball (1): 2000
 Golf (1): 2004
 Soccer (2): 2008, 2013
 Swimming and diving (2): 1995, 2005
 Track and field (5): 1996, 1998, 1999, 2005, 2006
 Volleyball (1): 2001
 Water polo (1): 2018
Coed (1)
 Badminton (1): 1998

State championships

Boys (6)
 Track and field: 1931
 Water polo: 2001, 2002, 2003, 2004, 2005
Girls (5)
 Golf: 2004
 Soccer: 2008
 Track and field: 1996, 1998, 2006

National championships

Boys (1)
 Baseball: 2007
Girls (1)
 Soccer: 2008

Alumni

Bradley Nowell, frontman of the ska punk band Sublime

Olympics
Since the 1952 Summer Olympics, 38 Bruins have participated in the quadrennial Olympic Games. By the conclusion of the 2016 Summer Olympics, the Bruins have gathered 16 Olympiads. Long Beach Wilson has been recognized by ESPN for their output of Olympians.

Medals of Long Beach Wilson

1952 Summer Olympics in Helsinki, Finland 

1956 Summer Olympics in Melbourne, Victoria, Australia 

1972 Summer Olympics in Munich, West Germany 

1976 Summer Olympics in Montreal, Quebec, Canada 

1984 Summer Olympics in Los Angeles, California, United States 

1988 Summer Olympics in Seoul, South Korea 

1992 Summer Olympics in Barcelona, Catalonia, Spain  

2000 Summer Olympics in Sydney, New South Wales, Australia 

2004 Summer Olympics in Athens, Greece 

2008 Summer Olympics in Beijing, China 

2012 Summer Olympics in London, United Kingdom 

Note: If applicable, the college attended is where one studied for undergraduate education and competed at the college level; all other colleges where an athlete attended for another kind of education and/or competition are excluded.

References

High schools in Long Beach, California
Wilson
Wilson
 
Educational institutions established in 1926
1926 establishments in California